The men's time trial H1 road cycling event at the 2020 Summer Paralympics took place on 31 August 2021, at Fuji Speedway, Tokyo. 7 riders competed in the event.

The H1 classification is for tetraplegics with severe upper limb impairment to the C6 vertebra. These riders operate a hand-operated cycle.

Results
The event took place on 31 August 2021, at 10:25:

References

Men's road time trial H1